Marjory Allen, Baroness Allen of Hurtwood (née Gill; 10 May 1897 – 11 April 1976), known to her friends as Joan, was an English landscape architect and promoter of child welfare.

Marjory Gill was born in Bexleyheath, Kent. She was a cousin of Eric Gill and sister of Colin Gill. She was educated at Bedales School and University College, Reading, where she took a diploma course in horticulture. In 1921 she married Clifford Allen, a leading member of the Independent Labour Party who had been imprisoned as a conscientious objector in World War I. Marjory Allen worked as a landscape architect throughout the 1920s and 1930s and was elected the first fellow of the Institute of Landscape Architects in 1930.

Clifford Allen, who had been created 1st Baron Allen of Hurtwood in 1932, died in 1939, and Lady Allen threw herself into her work, also becoming interested in the welfare of children. Her campaigning for children in institutional care led to the passing of the Children Act 1948. She was chairman (1942–1948) and president (1948–1951) of the Nursery School Association of Great Britain, founder president of the World Organisation for Early Childhood Education, a member of the Central Advisory Council for Education (1945–1949), and chairman of the Advisory Council on Children's Entertainment Films (1944–1950). During the Second World War, Lady Allen, with the support of the Home Secretary, Herbert Morrison, with whom she was friends, established a scheme whereby waste material from the bomb sites were turned into children's toys. After World War II she served as a liaison officer with UNICEF in Europe and the Middle East.

She campaigned for facilities for children growing up in the new high-rise developments in Britain's cities and wrote a series of illustrated books on the subject of playgrounds, and at least one book on adventure playgrounds, spaces for free creativity by children, which helped the idea spread worldwide.

References
Dictionary of National Biography

Further reading
Marjory Allen & Mary Nicholson: Memoirs of an Uneducated Lady: Lady Allen of Hurtwood, Thames & Hudson Ltd, 1975

External links
Catalogue of Allen's papers, held at the Modern Records Centre, University of Warwick
 Lady Allen of Hurtwood and Susan Jellicoe 'The New Small Garden' 1956, 128 pp THE ARCHITECTURAL PRESS LONDON

1897 births
1976 deaths
People from Bexleyheath
Alumni of the University of Reading
Allen of Hurtwood
English landscape architects
English women writers
People educated at Bedales School
British women architects